The 1953 Arkansas Razorbacks football team represented the University of Arkansas as a member of the Southwest Conference (SWC) during the 1953 college football season. In their first year under head coach Bowden Wyatt, the Razorbacks compiled an overall record of 3–7 record  with a mark of 2–4 against conference opponents, finished in fifth place in the SWC, and were outscored by their opponents by a combined total of 161 to 116.

Arkansas quarterback Lamar McHan finished ninth in the Heisman Trophy voting for 1953. McHan was sixth in the nation in yards per punt, and tied for sixth in punt return yards.  Receiver Floyd Sagely's receiving stats were tied for sixth best in the country.

Schedule

References

Arkansas
Arkansas Razorbacks football seasons
Arkansas Razorbacks football